George Chatterton may refer to:
 George Chatterton (politician)
 George Chatterton (British Army officer)
 George Chatterton (cricketer)